Patrick Todd (born November 14, 1979) is a retired American rower. He competed in the lightweight coxless fours at the 2004 and 2008 Olympics and placed 9th and 11th, respectively. Todd won a gold and a silver medal in the lightweight eights at the world championships in 2003 and 2008.

Todd is a 1998 graduate of St. Xavier High School in Cincinnati and a 2002 graduate of Harvard College.

References

External links

1979 births
Living people
American male rowers
Olympic rowers of the United States
Rowers at the 2004 Summer Olympics
Rowers at the 2008 Summer Olympics
St. Xavier High School (Ohio) alumni
World Rowing Championships medalists for the United States
Harvard Crimson rowers